Joaquim António Jorge (born 18 February 1939 in Maputo) is a former Portuguese footballer who played as a defender.

External links 
 
 
 Data at World Football

1939 births
Living people
Portuguese footballers
Association football defenders
Primeira Liga players
FC Porto players
Vitória S.C. players
Portugal international footballers
Sportspeople from Maputo